Thomas Talbot (1818 – March 26, 1901) was an Irish-born educator and political figure in Newfoundland. He represented St. John's West in the Newfoundland and Labrador House of Assembly from 1861 to 1870 as a Liberal and then Anti-Confederate.

The son of William Talbot, he was born in County Kilkenny and came to Newfoundland in 1837. Talbot taught school in Harbour Grace and later St. John's. He served as a member of the Executive Council from 1869 to 1872 as a minister without portfolio. He resigned after he was named high sheriff in 1872. In 1870, he was named to the Legislative Council and served until his death in St. John's in 1901.

In 1882, Talbot published Newfoundland; or, a letter addressed to a friend in Ireland in relation to the condition and circumstances of the island of Newfoundland, with an especial view to emigration.

References

External links 
 

Members of the Newfoundland and Labrador House of Assembly
1818 births
1901 deaths
People from County Kilkenny
Newfoundland Colony people
Members of the Executive Council of Newfoundland and Labrador